Olios giganteus is a large species of crab spider in the family Sparassidae. It is found in the United States and Mexico.

Characteristics 
Olios giganteus are primarily coloured black, brown tan and orange. The spider has a crab-like appearance due to their legs being "laterigrade", at the base so as to be oriented in a horizontal plane rather than a vertical plane. The total leg span of Olios giganteus can be up to 3 inches.

References

External links

 

Sparassidae
Articles created by Qbugbot
Spiders described in 1884